Ciudad Colonial (Spanish for "Colonial City") is the historic central neighborhood of the Dominican Republic's capital Santo Domingo. It is the oldest continuously inhabited European-established settlement in the Americas. The area has been declared a World Heritage Site by UNESCO. It is also known as Zona Colonial (Colonial Zone) or more colloquially as "La Zona" (The Zone). 

The Ciudad Colonial is located on the west bank of the Ozama River, which bisects the city. It covers  bounded by a walled perimeter. It is an important section of the city due to the high number of landmarks, including Alcázar de Colón, Fortaleza Ozama, Catedral de Santa María la Menor, and others. The area is the main tourist attraction of Santo Domingo, even though the main sites of governmental and commercial activity are now in the more modern parts of the city.

History

The first settlement of what is now Santo Domingo was established by Bartholomew Columbus on the East bank of the Ozama River near the end of the 15th century. After the 1502 hurricane that claimed Francisco de Bobadilla among its victims, however, the city was relocated on the West bank under the leadership of Nicolás de Ovando. Ovando and his successor Diego Colón presided over the first constructions of the Colonial City, many of which still exist today. Santo Domingo's fortifications were an important feature of the urban landscape. The defense wall (muralla) extended from the Ozama River to the Puerta del Conde, which was the entrance to the hinterland and the Western boundary of the city until the late 19th century.

The Spaniards used this settlement as the first point of influence in the Americas, from which they conquered other Caribbean islands and much of the mainland of the Americas. Santo Domingo was initially the political and cultural hub of Spanish presence in the new world, but after a few decades started to decline as the Spaniards focused their attention more on the mainland after conquering Mexico, Peru, and other regions of Latin America. Ciudad Colonial nevertheless remained an important historical site.

In 1655, the Ciudad Colonial was submitted to a siege led by the English officers William Penn and Robert Venables. The 1655 invasion was thwarted by Spanish troops commanded by the Captain General of the Colony, Don Bernardino de Meneses y Bracamonte, Count of Peñalva, to whom the Puerta del Conde ("Gate of the Count") is named after. The defensive wall was modified during this episode. Prior to the invasion, there was a fort at the site where the Puerta del Conde is today, Fuerte San Genaro. It is believed that the modification that occurred after the siege involved the expansion of the wall to the fort, effectively creating a bastion, El Baluarte del Conde.

In the late 19th century and early 20th century, the city started to expand beyond its old boundaries but the Ciudad Colonial remained the main hub of activity until the Trujillo era. Trujillo also presided over the restoration of major monuments, including the Alcázar de Colón in the early 1950s.

Colonial City today

The central public space of the district is Parque Colon, a square that borders the 16th-century Cathedral and has a late-19th-century bronze statue of Christopher Columbus in its center. East of Parque Colón, the cobblestone Calle Las Damas is the New World's oldest paved street, dating from 1502. The street is bordered by many of the zone's more prominent landmarks, including Fortaleza Ozama, the site of major events in Dominican history; Casa de Bastidas, which now houses a children's museum; the French Embassy, in a building said to have been the house of Hernán Cortés; the Casa de Ovando, said to be the former residence of Governor Nicolás de Ovando and now a luxury hotel call Hodelpa Nicolas de Ovando; the National Pantheon of the Dominican Republic; and the Museo de las Casas Reales, in the former governors' palace and Audiencia building.

Calle del Conde is a pedestrian-only street that includes several notable commercial buildings of the early 20th century and connects Parque Colon with the Puerta del Conde and Parque Independencia. Another traditional commercial district is the portion of Avenida Duarte just north of the Zona Colonial, which is currently undergoing a renovation plan that aims to make the area more appealing to tourists.

On the north end of Calle Las Damas, the restored and expanded Plaza de España is bordered by Las Atarazanas (former naval yard, now a museum) and a number of small shops and restaurants. This area was one of the first commercial centers in the Americas, and is still a hub of activity today. The Alcázar de Colón, having once been the colonial palace of the Columbus family—beginning with his son Diego—is now a museum displaying period furniture and decorations. The building was originally built in 1510, and restored to its current appearance in 1952.

A 700 million US dollar investment was made in the Port of the Ozama river adjacent to the Ciudad Colonial aiming to turn Santo Domingo into a port of call for luxury cruise ships and including a privately owned marina. The project is being completed by Sans Soucí Ports S.A. It is hoped that this ambitious project will boost the attraction of the Ciudad Colonial and the rest of Santo Domingo to international tourists.

Historical sites of Ciudad Colonial

In the Ciudad Colonial there are different places built by the Spaniards during the colonial era, which together form more than 300 historical sites in the area; these include various monuments of cultural and historical character, as well as houses of great figures of the society of that time, but it can not fail to mention important streets, such as the Las Damas street. Some of these are:

Gallery

See also

Colony of Santo Domingo
Timeline of Santo Domingo
Port of Santo Domingo
Old San Juan, Puerto Rico
Old Havana, Cuba

References

Works Cited 

 Moreta Castillo, Américo "El Santo Domingo del Siglo XVIII a través del Libro Becerro".  "CLIO" 74  (Santo Domingo, 2007) pp.&nbsp; 43–66.
 González Hernández, Julio Amable "Toponomía y Genealogía: La Ciudad Colonial (2 de 15)". "IDG" (Santo Domingo, 2007)
 Alemar, Luis "La Ciudad de Santo Domingo: Santo Domingo, Ciudad Trujillo". "Editora de Santo Domingo" (Santo Domingo, 1980)

External links 
 The Colonial Zone Chronicles -promotes the cultural life of the City
 Unesco's World Heritage Site for Colonial City of Santo Domingo
 Guide to Colonial Zone, Santo Domingo, Dominican Republic by Janette Keys

 
History of Santo Domingo
Historic districts
History of the Colony of Santo Domingo
Populated places established in 1502
Geography of Santo Domingo
Spanish Colonial architecture in the Dominican Republic
Tourist attractions in Santo Domingo
World Heritage Sites in the Dominican Republic